KRZD (1550 AM) is a radio station licensed to Springfield, Missouri. KRZD airs a mainstream rock format branded as "Z107.5".

KRZD has historically been run by the Branson Ticket Outlet and Welcome Center and most ads are directed at bringing tourists into the Ticket Center location. Many of the Ticket Outlet's radio spots advertise free soft drinks and email access for tourists as well as a Milton Crabapple compact disc.

On May 20, 2020, KRZD changed their format from travelers' information (targeted to Branson, Missouri) to mainstream rock, branded as "Z107.5".

References

External links

RZD
Radio stations established in 1975
1975 establishments in Missouri
Mainstream rock radio stations in the United States